Meas is a Khmer name meaning "gold". It can be used as a given name or a surname. Notable people with the name include:

Surname
Meas Samon, Cambodian rock singer and comedian
Meas Kheng (born 1946), Cambodian sprinter
Meas Sophea (born 1955), Cambodian general
Sam Meas (born ), Cambodian-born American politician

Given name
Keo Meas (1926–1976), Cambodian communist politician

Khmer-language names